Gustav Adolfs torg  is a public square in central Stockholm, Sweden.

Description
The site was 
named after King Gustav II Adolf. In the middle of the square there is a statue of Gustav II Adolf  by the French-born, Swedish  sculptor Pierre Hubert L'Archevêque (1721–1778) which was erected in 1796.

The square is home to the Royal Opera, Arvfurstens palats (housing the Ministry for Foreign Affairs) and the Ministry of Defence. South of the square are the Riksdag Building on Helgeandsholmen and the Royal Palace in Gamla stan.

See also 
 Norrbro
 Lejonbacken

References

Squares in Stockholm
Cultural depictions of Gustavus Adolphus of Sweden
Statues of monarchs
Statues of military officers
Equestrian statues in Sweden